Archduke Johann's Great Love (German: Erzherzog Johanns große Liebe) is a 1950 Austrian historical romantic drama film directed by Hans Schott-Schöbinger and starring Marte Harell, O.W. Fischer and Christl Mardayn.

The film's sets were designed by the art directors Isabella Schlichting and Werner Schlichting.

Synopsis
Following the end of the Napoleonic Wars, the more liberal-minded Habsburg Archduke John supports reforms in the Austrian Empire and German Confederation but is thwarted by machinations of the reactionary Klemens von Metternich. Things are complicated further when Archduke John falls in love with the commoner Anna Plochl and wishes to marry her.

Cast
 Marte Harell as Anna Plochl
 O.W. Fischer as Erzherzog Johann
 Christl Mardayn as Kaiserin
 Josef Meinrad as Vertrauter des Erzherzogs
 Leopold Rudolf as Invalider Tiroler
 Albin Skoda as Fuerst Metternich
 Franz Pfaudler as Plochl, Posthalter von Aussee
 Franz Herterich as Kaiser Franz I.
 Oskar Sima as Armbrustschuetze
 Theodor Danegger as Diener
 Auguste Pünkösdy as Zofe

References

Bibliography 
 Fritsche, Maria. Homemade Men In Postwar Austrian Cinema: Nationhood, Genre and Masculinity . Berghahn Books, 2013.
 Von Dassanowsky, Robert. Austrian Cinema: A History. McFarland, 2005.

External links 
 

1950 films
Austrian historical drama films
1950s historical drama films
1950s German-language films
Films directed by Hans Schott-Schöbinger
Films set in the 19th century
Films set in Vienna